Chitipa South is a constituency for the National Assembly of Malawi, located in the Chitipa District of Malawi's Northern Region. It elects one Member of Parliament by the first past the post system. The constituency is currently represented by People's Party MP Werani Chilenga.

Election results

References

Constituencies of the National Assembly of Malawi